Manon Minaud (born 21 October 1998) is a French racing cyclist, who rides for French amateur team Groupama Elles Pays de la Loire.

References

External links
 

1998 births
Living people
French female cyclists
Place of birth missing (living people)